Cavad (also, Dzhavad and Dzhavat) is a village and municipality in the Sabirabad Rayon of Azerbaijan.  It has a population of 3,151. It takes its name from the short lived Javad Khanate.

References 

Populated places in Sabirabad District